Xinshougang (Shougang Park) station is a subway station on Line 11 of the Beijing Subway. The station opened on December 31, 2021.

Platform Layout
The station has an underground island platform. Only one side of the platform is in use.

Exits
There are 4 exits, lettered A, B, C and D. Exit A is accessible.

Notes

References

External links

Beijing Subway stations in Shijingshan District
Railway stations in China opened in 2021